The Osborne Public Carnegie Library is a historic Carnegie library in Osborne, Kansas.  It was built around 1913 and was listed on the National Register of Historic Places in 1987.

It is located at Third and Main in Osborne, the county seat of Osborne County.

It is Classical Revival in style, and is a one-story ted brick building built upon a raised limestone block foundation.

It served as the town's public library from 1912 to 1995, and later, including in 2022, has served as a regional history and genealogical library operated by the Osborne County Genealogical and Historical Society.

References

External links

Carnegie libraries in Kansas
National Register of Historic Places in Osborne County, Kansas
Buildings and structures completed in 1913